Richard Henry Nelson (November 10, 1859 - April 25, 1931) was the second bishop of the Episcopal Diocese of Albany in the United States from 1913 to 1929, as well as being coadjutor from 1904 to 1913 under the first bishop, William Croswell Doane.

Biography
Nelson attended Trinity Collage where he was a member of the Fraternity of Delta Psi (St. Anthony Hall) and received a B.A. He also attended the University of Pennsylvania, receiving a M.A. and D.D.

Nelson was Rector of St. Peter's Episcopal Church in Philadelphia until 1903.  Nelson was elected in 1903 as a bishop coadjutor of Albany.  He "was consecrated at a most impressive service in the Cathedral, [on] May 19, 1904."

He served as a bishop for almost thirty years, an extraordinarily long time.  Nelson was highly active during all that time: preaching, confirming, and consecrating persons, especially in the northern mission of the diocese in the Adirondack Mountains.

He was replaced by G. Ashton Oldham.

See also

 List of Episcopal bishops (U.S.)

References

External links
 Cathedral of All Saints web site
 Episcopal Diocese of Albany official web site

1859 births
1931 deaths
American Anglo-Catholics
Religious leaders from Albany, New York
Anglo-Catholic bishops
Episcopal bishops of Albany

Trinity College (Connecticut) alumni
University of Pennsylvania alumni
St. Anthony Hall